Dalboredden is the northernmost part of the Swedish province Dalsland. It is the only part of the former province which is in Värmland County rather than in Västra Götaland County.

References

Dalsland
Geography of Värmland County